Gusev, or Guseva (feminine), is a Russian surname derived from the word  (goos, meaning "goose"). Husyev or Husyeva is Ukrainian adaptation of the name.

Notable people with the surname include:
Aleksandr Gusev (field hockey) (1955–1994), former field hockey player from the Soviet Union
Aleksandr Gusev (ice hockey) (1947–2020), former Soviet ice hockey player and Olympic champion
Alexandr Vladimirovich Gussev or Gusev (1917–1999), Russian parasitologist, specialist of monogeneans
Alexey Gusev (1945–2001), Soviet naval officer and Hero of the Soviet Union
Andrei Gusev (born 1952), Russian writer and journalist
Dmitry Sergeyevich Gusev (1915-1987), Soviet army officer
Dmitry Gusev (born 1972), Russian politician
Ekaterina Guseva (born 1976), popular Russian actress
Khioniya Guseva, Russian woman famous for attempting to murder Grigori Rasputin
Klara Guseva (1937–2019), former Soviet speed skater
Matvey Gusev (1826–1866), Russian astronomer
Natalya Guseva
Natalia Evgenievna Guseva (born 1972), Soviet actress
Natalya Romanovna Guseva, Russian ethnographer and indologist
Natalia Vladimirovna Guseva (born 1982), Russian biathlete
Nikita Gusev (born 1992), Russian ice hockey player
Nikolay Ivanovich Gusev (1897–1962), Soviet general
Nikolay Nicolaevich Gusev (critic) (1882–1967), Soviet literary critic and author of books about Tolstoy
Nikolay Nikolaevich Gusev (chess player) (born 1922), Soviet chess master
Oleh Husyev (born 1983), Ukrainian footballer
Oleg Andreyevich Gusev (born 1964), Russian entrepreneur
Pavel Gusev
Pyotr Gusev (1904–1987), Soviet ballet dancer, choreographer and teacher
Rolan Gusev (born 1977), Russian footballer
Sergei Gusev (born 1975), Russian ice hockey player
Serhiy Husyev, Ukrainian football player
Sergey Ivanovich Gusev (1874–1933), Russian/Soviet statesman and politician
Vladimir Gusev
Vladimir Nikolayevich Gusev (born 1982), Russian road racing cyclist
Vladimir Vitalyevich Gusev (born 1982), Russian ice hockey player
Vladimir Kuzmich Gusev (1932–2022), Soviet and Russian politician
Viktor Mikhaylovich Gusev (1909–1944), Soviet songwriter, playwright and screenwriter
Viktor Mikhaylovich Gusev (born 1955), Russian sports commentator

Russian-language surnames